Khalilur Rahman is a Bangladeshi diplomat and the Bangladeshi High Commissioner to Canada. He is the former chief coordinator of corona cell at the Ministry of Foreign Affairs.

Early life 
Rahman is a medical doctor from Rajshahi Medical College. He has a M.A. from École nationale d'administration and MPhil from Sorbonne University. He has a PhD in Public Health from Jawaharlal Nehru University.

Career 
Rahman joined the Bangladesh Civil Service as a foreign service cadre in 1985.

During the COVID-19 pandemic in Bangladesh, Rahman was appointed head of the Corona cell at the Ministry of Foreign Affairs in December 2019. On 16 August 2020, Rahman was appointed the High Commissioner of Bangladesh to Canada. He was appointed to International Civil Aviation Organization. He had previously served at the World Health Organization.

Rahman was assaulted at a picnic of the Bangladeshi community in Canada by a former employee of the High Commission, Yusuf Harun, who had refused to return to Bangladesh after his term ended at the commission and alleged his passport was being held by the commission.

References 

Living people
High Commissioners of Bangladesh to Canada
Year of birth missing (living people)
Bangladeshi physicians
École nationale d'administration alumni
Sorbonne University
Jawaharlal Nehru University alumni